Katharine Sergeant Angell White (September 17, 1892 – July 20, 1977) was a writer and the fiction editor for The New Yorker magazine from 1925 to 1960. In her obituary, printed in The New Yorker in 1977, William Shawn wrote, "More than any other editor except Harold Ross himself, Katharine White gave The New Yorker its shape, and set it on its course."

Biography
Katharine Sergeant was born to Charles Spencer Sergeant and Elizabeth Shepley in Winchester, Massachusetts on September 17, 1892. She had two older sisters, Elizabeth and Rosamund. She grew up in Brookline, Massachusetts at 4 Hawthorn Road. Katharine's's sister, Elizabeth Shepley Sergeant, a 1903 graduate of Bryn Mawr College, was also a writer. Elizabeth, called "Elsie," wrote books about Willa Cather (a personal friend), poet Robert Frost, and the Pueblo Indians of New Mexico.

Katharine graduated from Bryn Mawr College in 1914. On May 22, 1915, she married Ernest Angell, an attorney and the future president of the ACLU, in Brookline, Massachusetts.

She began working for Harold Ross at The New Yorker in 1925, six months after its inception. She started out reading unsolicited manuscripts for two hours a day, then quickly moved to full-time work. She proved indispensable as an editor, writer, and shaper of the magazine's advertising policy. She was a literate, elegant, and cultivated woman whom James Thurber described as "the fountain and shrine of The New Yorker." The writer and critic Nancy Franklin observed of White's crucial role at The New Yorker, "In some ways, Katharine White’s ambitions for the magazine surpassed Ross’s: she pushed him to publish serious poetry (while also attempting to keep the flame of light verse alive as the supply of talented practitioners dwindled over the years); she had adventurous tastes, and enlarged the scope of both the magazine’s fiction and the factual pieces; and she saw that the magazine’s sense of humor, in its writing and in its cartoons, could be raised above the level of a 'comic paper,' which is how Ross sometimes referred to his magazine."

Throughout her career at The New Yorker, White proved to be deft at handling fiction, nonfiction, poetry, and "casuals" (the name the magazine gave to humor pieces). She served as The New Yorker'''s first fiction editor. She edited and helped develop the careers of several significant 20th-century writers, including Vladimir Nabokov, John O'Hara, Mary McCarthy, John Cheever, John Updike, and Ogden Nash.

In 1929, White divorced her husband and married E. B. White, a New Yorker writer, whom she had recommended that Ross hire. They were both back at work at The New Yorker the next day. After this marriage, she became known as Katharine S. White.

She was the mother (from her first marriage) of a son, Roger Angell, and daughter, Nancy Angell Stableford. Roger Angell spent decades as fiction editor for The New Yorker and was a well-known baseball writer and poet. Her other son, Joel White, was a naval architect and boat-builder who owned Brooklin Boatyard in Brooklin, Maine.

White originally wrote under the name Katharine Sergeant Angell. As Katharine White, her only book, Onward and Upward in the Garden, was published after her death. It is a compilation of her garden articles and journals. Horticulture magazine stated, "Although she never claimed to be more than an amateur, her pieces, especially her famous surveys of garden catalogs, are remarkable for their fierce intelligence and crisp prose." Her husband credits this book project with saving his own life after her death, as it gave him her words every day, and something to work on after she had died.

Death
After having survived four previous heart attacks, Katharine White died of congestive heart failure at the age of 84 on July 20, 1977.

BooksOnward and Upward in the Garden'', edited, and with an introduction by E. B. White, New York: Farrar, Straus, Giroux, c. 1979.

References

External links
Katharine White complete biography and career at The New Yorker magazine

1892 births
1977 deaths
Bryn Mawr College alumni
The New Yorker staff writers
The New Yorker editors
The New Yorker people
American women non-fiction writers
Women magazine editors
20th-century American women
20th-century American people
20th-century American writers
People from Winchester, Massachusetts
Writers from Massachusetts